The Halifax Regional Municipality is governed by a mayor (elected at large) and a twenty-three person council, who are elected by geographic district; municipal elections occur every four years.  HRM has established community councils where three or more councillors agree to form these councils to deal primarily with local development issues. Most community council decisions are subject to final approval by regional council. The incumbent Mayor of the Halifax Regional Municipality was Peter J. Kelly.

The Halifax Regional Council is responsible for all facets of municipal government, including the Halifax Regional Police, Halifax Public Libraries, Halifax Fire and Emergency, Halifax Regional Water Commission, parks and recreation, civic addressing, public works, waste management, and planning and development.

The 2008 municipal elections of the Halifax Regional Municipality took place on 18 October 2008 in conjunction with Municipal elections across the province. Elections have been held every four years since the amalgamation of the cities of Halifax and Dartmouth, the town of Bedford and Halifax County into the Halifax Regional Municipality in 1996. At the time, the regional council was made up of twenty-three councillors and one mayor, all positions were up for election.

There are no political parties at the municipal level in Nova Scotia, so all candidates run as independents. Voter turnout in the last 2004 mayoral election was 54.45%.

Advance voting was available using an internet voting system.

Halifax Regional Municipality Mayor

(Polls reporting: 569 of 570)

District 1: Eastern Shore - Musquodoboit Valley 

2004 Election - Steve Streatch 2,366 (46.4%);  Laurie Taylor 1,367 (26.9%);  Martin Singh 740 (14.59%);  Randy Carter 600 (11.83%) - Voter turnout: 54.58%

District 2: Waverley - Fall River - Beaver Bank 

2004 Election - Krista Snow 2,577 (34.86%);  Wayne MacRae 2,317 (31.34%);  David Merrigan 1,573 (21.28%);  Alexander Boyd 866 (11.71%);  John Woods 60 (0.81%) - Voter turnout: 58.57%

District 3: Preston - Lawrencetown - Chezzetcook 

2004 Election - David Hendsbee 4,217 (71.58%);  Dexter Power 1,244 (21.12%);  David Hill 430 (7.30%) - Voter Turnout: 43.93%

District 4: Cole Harbour 

2004 Election - Harry McInroy 3,566 (54.19%);  Ron Cooper 3,014 (45.81%) - Voter Turnout: 48.22%

District 5:  Dartmouth Centre 

2004 Election - Gloria McCluskey 3,217 (54.13%);  John M. Cunningham 1,546 (26.01%);  Peter Majeau 1,180 (19.86%) - Voter turnout: 50.51%

District 6: Dartmouth East - The Lakes 

2004 Election - Andrew Younger 3,263 (51.74%);  Brian Warshick 2,748 (43.58%);  Henry (Hank) J. White 295 (4.68%) - Voter Turnout: 52.19%

District 7: Portland - East Woodlawn 

2004 Election - Bill Karsten 1,656 (25.89%);  Emmett Austin 1,533 (23.96%);  Monique Smith 1,505 (23.53%);  Norman Wiechert 1,243 (19.43%);  John L. MacDougall 460 (7.19%) - Voter Turnout: 54.05%

District 8: Woodside  - Eastern Passage 

2007 By-election - Jackie Barkhouse 48.31;  Brian Birt 25.12;  David F Boyd 2;  Beverley Skaalrud-Woodfield 24.58
2004 Election - Becky Kent 1,977 (39.53%);  Bruce F. Hetherington 1,359 (27.17%);  Maurice Henneberry 1,049 (20.98%);  Steven Michael Barkhouse 616 (12.32%) - Voter Turnout: 42.95%

District 9: Albro Lake - Harbourview 

2004 Election - Jim Smith 2,421 (66.73%);  Clint Schofield 1,207 (33.27%) - Voter turnout: 36.14%

District 10: Clayton Park West 

2004 Election - Mary Wile 1097 (27.28%);  Jeff Campbell 987 (24.55%);  David Salah 789 (19.62%);  Christine Smith 594 (14.77%);  Daniel Roukema 554 (13.78%) - Voter turnout: 42.18%

District 11: Halifax North End 

2004 Election - Patrick Murphy 1745 (35.15%);  Eva Moore 1457 (29.35%);  Debbie Kelly 603 (12.15%);  Jocelyn Yerxa 556 (11.20%);  Pat Pottie 381 (7.68%);  Michael White 112 (2.26%);  Michael Parsons 110 (2.22%) - Voter Turnout: 45.83%

District 12: Halifax Downtown 

2004 Election - Dawn Marie Sloane 1586 (51.78%);  Irvine Carvery 717 (23.41%);  Caley MacLennan 439 (14.33%);  Mark Daye 321 (10.48%) - Voter Turnout: 35.83%

District 13: Northwest Arm - South End and Sable Island 

2004 Election - Sue Uteck 3141 (62.45%);  Beverly Miller 1636 (32.52%);  John Davis 253 (5.03%) - Voter turnout: 47.03%

District 14: Connaught - Quinpool 

2004 Election - Sheila Fougere 3894 (81.01%);  Stephen Parsons 777 (16.16%);  Alexander Sang Lam 136 (2.83%) - Voter Turnout: 46.50%

District 15: Fairview  - Clayton Park 

2004 Election - Russell Walker 2953 (69.17%);  Nathaniel Smith 1316 (30.83%) - Voter Turnout: 43.52%

District 16: Rockingham   - Wentworth 

2003 By-Election - Debbie Hum 65.53%;  Mary Wile 34.39%

District 17: Purcell's Cove - Armdale 

2004 Election - Linda Mosher 3545 (68.32%);  Graham Read 1087 (20.95%);  Bill Meagher 557 (10.73%) - Voter turnout: 53.08%

District 18: Spryfield  - Herring Cove 

2004 Election - Steve Adams 3164 (62.47%);  Bruce Cooke 1005 (19.84%);  Jerry MacKinlay 612 (12.08%);  Charlie Reardon 284 (5.61%) - Voter Turnout: 46.13%

District 19: Sackville - Lucasville 

2004 Election - Brad 'BJ' Johns 4028 (70.33);  Raymond Smardon 827 (14.44%);  Phil Syms 620 (10.83%);  John Ferguson 252 (4.40%) - Voter turnout: 49.05%

District 20: Lower Sackville 

2004 Election - Bob Harvey 3089 (54.23%);  George A Hoskins 1613 (28.32%);  Steve Blackmore 994 (17.45%) - Voter turnout: 48.85

District 21: Bedford 

2006 By-election -  Gary Martin 56.07;  Ed McHugh 43.93

District 22: Timberlea - Prospect 

2004 Election - Reg Rankin 2038 (28.5%); Barb Allen 1999 (27.96%);  Jack Mitchell 1426 (19.94%);  Gary Sampson 732 (10.24%);  Kathy Melanson 591 (8.27%);  Lisa Mullin 201 (2.81%);  Dennis Kirby 163 (2.28%) - Voter Turnout: 54.89%

District 23: Hammonds Plains - St. Margaret's 

2004 Election - Gary Meade 2984 (47.68%);  Byron Kennedy 1177 (18.8%); Mike Marriott 650 (10.39%);  Bill Woodwort 629 (10.05%);  Kevin Hubley 535 (8.55%);  John Profit 284 (4.54%) - Voter Turnout: 54.73%

References

External links
 List of candidates from HRM site
 The Coast Halifax Votes 2008

2008
2008 elections in Canada